Burke's Landed Gentry (originally titled Burke's Commoners) is a reference work listing families in Great Britain and Ireland who have owned rural estates of some size. The work has been in existence from the first half of the 19th century, and was founded by John Burke. He and successors from the Burke family, and others since, have written in it on genealogy and heraldry relating to gentry families. 

It has evolved alongside Burke's Peerage, Baronetage & Knightage. The two works are regarded as complementing each other. Since the early 20th century, the work includes families that historically possessed landed property.

Rationale

The title of the first edition in 1833 expressed its scope clearly: A Genealogical and Heraldic History of the Commoners of Great Britain and Ireland, enjoying Territorial Possessions or High Official Rank, but uninvested with Heritable Honours. It looked at both the family history and the arms of selected families who owned land or occupied important posts in the United Kingdom, but did not hold inherited titles. This excluded group, consisting of peers and baronets, had their own book called Burke's Peerage.

At the time the series started, the group it covered had considerable political, social and economic influence in their localities and in some cases nationally. During the 20th century, the power of rural landowners and the public's interest in buying books about them largely disappeared. Few of the families in the books still own country estates, a rare example being the Fulfords of Great Fulford near Dunsford in Devon who were mentioned in the 2012 TV series "Country House Rescue" and were described in Burke's Landed Gentry as having lived there since the reign of King Richard I (1189–1199). 

Until 1914, possession of landed property was a strict requirement. If a family sold or lost its estates, it was no longer included in Burke's Landed Gentry. Illustrating this point, at least half of the families included in 1861 were omitted from the 1914 edition. Following the alienation of families from their land after the First World War, the editors considered that such a strict policy was no longer productive, and in recognition of historical and genealogical value many pedigrees appeared titled (family name) 'formerly of' or 'late of' (place).

Uses
Owing to the characteristic prose style developed by John Burke, the publication's founder, the material included in Burke's Landed Gentry, often based on work by many earlier authorities, was made more readable than had previously been the case, a style maintained by his successors. This prose style, when subsequently employed by John Burke's son, Ulster King of Arms Sir Bernard Burke, took a turn towards flowery wording in keeping with the literary tastes of the Victorian period in which he wrote. 

The widespread inclusion of family legends which, due to the large number of families included in each edition, the Burke family were unable to comprehensively check, resulted in some criticism of the accuracy of information contained in the volumes. Accordingly, more recent editions are more scrupulously checked and rewritten for accuracy. Advertisements for the 1894 edition stated: "Apocryphal statements, which had crept into former editions, have been expunged, erroneous particulars and incorrect descents discovered and omitted..." 

This dedication to accuracy reached its peak under the chief editorship, from 1949 to 1959, of L. G. Pine – who was very sceptical regarding many families' claims to antiquity: 'If everybody who claims to have come over with the Conqueror were right, William must have landed with 200,000 men-at-arms instead of about 12,000', – and Hugh Massingberd (1971–83).

Editions

General

Irish supplement
The early editions of Burke's Landed Gentry were "of Great Britain and Ireland". After 1899, to allow the authors to cover the topics in more depth, there was a Great Britain edition and an Ireland edition. The Ireland edition is important for genealogists, because it includes not only the Old English (12th century onward arrivals) and the New English families (16th century onward arrivals), but also some of the leading elements of the Gaelic Irish families who previously ruled vast swathes of Ireland and maintained some influence, including the O'Briens, the O'Conors, the MacCarthys, the Kavanaghs, and more.

See also
 Burke's Peerage
 College of Arms

Notes

External links
 burkespeerage.com
 

.

1833 non-fiction books
History books about England
English society
Welsh society
Literature on heraldry
British biographical dictionaries
19th-century history books
20th-century history books
British genealogy
Irish genealogy